The Imperial Munitions Board (IMB) was the Canadian branch of the British Ministry of Munitions, set up in Canada under the chairmanship of Joseph Wesley Flavelle. It was formed by the British War Cabinet to alleviate the Shell Crisis of 1915 during the First World War. The Board was mandated to arrange for the manufacture of war materials in Canada on behalf of the British government.

It was the general and exclusive purchasing agent on behalf of the War Office, the Admiralty, the British Timber Controller, the Department of Aeronautics and the Ministry of Munitions, and also acted as an agent for the United States Ordnance Department.

History and organization

Shortly after the outbreak of World War I, the War Office approached the Canadian Department of Militia and Defence as to the possibility of supplying shells. Its Minister, Sam Hughes, appointed a Shell Committee in September 1914 to act on the War Office's behalf. The following were its members:

When the contracts became mired in political patronage that led to profiteering, David Lloyd George sent Lord Rhondda to Canada to investigate. Lionel Hitchens and R.H. Brand then came over and approached Joseph Wesley Flavelle to help form the IMB, and this move received the approval of Prime Minister Sir Robert Borden. In December 1915, the following were appointed:

As Chairman, Flavelle had full administrative and executive authority. The Board operated through twenty departments, of which the most important were Purchasing and Steel, Shipbuilding, Explosives, Forging, Aviation, Timber, Fuze and Engineering.

As certain shell manufacture contracts had been granted to persons that did not even have workshops, their holders were given deadlines to either start manufacturing them or forfeit the contracts. This led to political controversy later on, as the losers started to falsely accuse Flavelle of profiteering as well, because of his connection to the meat packing business.

Scope
In a 1917 address, Carnegie reported that the Board was then dealing with 650 factories in 144 towns, stretching from Halifax to Victoria. By 1918, the extent of its acquisition of lumber required the operation of 67 logging camps in British Columbia. The British Government was responsible for all its expenditure.

The British War Cabinet also noted the extent of Canada's war production in 1918:

Because the private sector was unwilling or unable to operate in certain fields, the Board established seven "National plants" for the production of explosives and propellants, and one for the manufacture of airplanes. The Board also oversaw the production of ships and aircraft.

It also formed several subsidiaries to perform several of the manufacturing functions, which were spread across Canada. These included:

When the Montreal Gazette profiled the War Toronto on its first visit to Montreal, on April 30, 1919, they described her as the last of 46 vessels built for the Imperial Munitions Board.

The IMB was dissolved in 1919. The process began immediately after the Armistice, when the Ministry of Munitions directed that it would be implemented through the following stages:

Production of all shells and explosives would cease immediately.
Gradually cease the production of items no longer required by the Government but which may be useful elsewhere (ie, metals and other materials).
Maintain contracts for articles still likely to be required (ie, commercial lumber and ships).

Impact
When contracting was transferred from the Shell Committee to the IMB, Flavelle decided that fair wage clauses would not be inserted into future contracts that were granted, although British and Canadian authorities did not object to continuing the prior practice. As the IMB was a British agency, its activities with respect to labour relations did not fall under federal jurisdiction until the passage of an order in council in March 1916 that extended the application of the Industrial Disputes Investigation Act, 1907, but Flavelle's opposition continued. This had the effect of disrupting relations with the Trades and Labour Congress of Canada, which would lead to the outbreak of strikes in 1918 and massive labour confrontations in 1919.

Further reading

Notes

References

External links

Government munitions production in the United Kingdom
Military history of Canada
United Kingdom defence procurement
Defunct public bodies of the United Kingdom
Military logistics of World War I
Military history of the United Kingdom during World War I